The Order of al-Hussein bin Ali is the highest order of the Kingdom of Jordan. It was founded on 22 June 1949 with one class (i.e. Collar) by King Abdullah I of Jordan with the scope of rewarding benevolence and foreign Heads of State. The class of Grand Cordon was introduced by King Hussein on 23 September 1967.

Insignia 
 The collar is made of a double chain in gold and enamel with alterning golden stars of five points and small dark red-enamelled flowers decorated in gold with sentences in Arabic
 The badge is made of a gold-and-diamond oval with at its centre a dark radiating red disc with a golden sentence in Arabic. The badge is hung to the Grand Cordon through ua golden royal crown.
 The plaque has the same design as the badge.
 The ribbon of the class of Grand Cordon is violet. The class of Collar has no ribbon.

Recipients
 Akihito
 Prince Ali bin Hussein
 Alia al-Hussein
 Azlan Shah of Perak
 Hassanal Bolkiah
 Habib Bourguiba
 Beji Caid Essebsi
 Carl XVI Gustaf of Sweden
 Elizabeth II
 Faisal II of Iraq
 Farouk of Egypt
 Harald V of Norway
 Hassan II of Morocco
 Prince Hassan bin Talal
 Václav Havel
 Hussein of Jordan
 Idris of Libya
 Isa bin Salman Al Khalifa
 Jaber Al-Ahmad Al-Sabah
 Juan Carlos I of Spain
 Mohammad Reza Pahlavi
 Mohammed V of Morocco
 Suharto
 Muhammad Zia-ul-Haq
 Mohammed VI of Morocco
 Margrethe II of Denmark
 Prince Muhammad bin Talal
 Philippe of Belgium
 Princess Muna al-Hussein
 Putra of Perlis
 Qaboos bin Said al Said
 Queen Rania of Jordan
 Mohammed Zahir Shah
 Hamad bin Khalifa Al Thani
 Zein al-Sharaf Talal
 Miloš Zeman
 Prince Ra'ad bin Zeid
 Salman of Saudi Arabia
 Sultan bin Salman Al Saud
 Mohammed bin Zayed Al Nahyan

Resources
 Order of al-Hussain ibn Ali
 Hussein ibn Ali Sash
 Order of al-Hussain ibn Ali

References 

Hussein bin Ali, Order of al-
Hussein bin Ali, Order of al-